Mehmet Husnu (born 25 July 1972) is a Cypriot former professional snooker player.

Career 
Born in 1972, Husnu turned professional in 1991, becoming the first Cypriot professional snooker player in the history of the game.

Husnu's career highlights came in his first two seasons; he reached the last 32 of the 1992 European Open, losing 0–5 to Jimmy White, and the same stage of the 1993 Welsh Open, where he was defeated 1–5 by James Wattana. He also made a 147 break during the 1999 China International tournament.

Husnu's opponent in his first qualifying match for the 1993 World Championship was Spencer Dunn, who defeated him 5–2; the match was Dunn's seventh en route to appearing in the last 32 at the Crucible Theatre.

Having performed poorly in the intervening years, Husnu was ranked 145th in the world at the end of the 1996/97 season, and lost his place on the tour, being forced to qualify to regain it the following year. This he did, subsequently maintaining his status for four years, before being relegated once more in 2002.

During the 2002/2003 season, Husnu reached the final of the 2002 Benson & Hedges Championship, losing 6–9 to Mark Davis, but having earned back his professional status, lost it again in 2004.

He entered several tournaments in 2004 and 2005, but after failing to qualify for the 2006 World Championship, Husnu left competitive snooker, aged 33.

Performance and rankings timeline

References 

Cypriot snooker players
1972 births
Living people